Pseudomonas stutzeri is a Gram-negative soil bacterium that is motile, has a single polar flagellum, and is classified as bacillus, or rod-shaped. While this bacterium was first isolated from human spinal fluid, it has since been found in many different environments due to its various characteristics and metabolic capabilities. P. stutzeri is an opportunistic pathogen in clinical settings, although infections are rare. Based on 16S rRNA analysis, this bacterium has been placed in the P. stutzeri group, to which it lends its name.

Taxonomy 
P. stutzeri is most easily differentiated from the other Pseudomonas spp. in that it does not produce fluorescent pigments. P. mendocina, P. alcaligenes, P. pseudoalcaligenes, and P. balearica are classified within the same branch of pseudomonads as P. stutzeri based on 16S rRNA sequences and other phylogenetic markers. Of this group, P. stutzeri is most closely related to P. balearica and they can be differentiated not only by the 16S rRNA sequences, but also by the ability of P. stutzeri to grow above 42 °C. P. stutzeri has been isolated in many different locations, and since each strain is a little different based on where it was isolated, the P. stutzeri group contains many genomovars. This means that the many strains of P. stutzeri can be considered genospecies, which are organisms that can only be differentiated based on their nucleic acid composition.

Discovery 
Burri and Stutzer first described P. stutzeri in 1895 and named the bacterium Bacillus denitrificans II. In 1902, Itersonion developed an enrichment culture for P. stutzeri, which was later described by van Niel and Allen in 1952. The enrichment medium is a mineral medium with 2% nitrate and tartrate (or malate, succinate, malonate, citrate, ethanol, or acetate) used under anaerobic conditions at 37 °C. The organism has been isolated from a wide variety of places such as human spinal fluid, straw, manure, soil, and canal water.

Characterization 
Pseudomonas stutzeri is a Gram-negative, rod-shaped, non-spore-forming bacterium that is typically 1–3 micrometres long and 0.5–0.8 micrometres wide. It tests positive for both the catalase and oxidase tests. P. stutzeri grows optimally at a temperature of about 35 °C, making it a mesophilic organism, although it can grow at temperatures as low as 4 °C and as high as 44 °C. When grown on a lysogeny broth (LB) medium at 32 °C, this bacterium has a doubling time of about 53 minutes. As the temperature is decreased to approximately 28 °C, the doubling time gets longer and can become as high as 72 minutes. On an asparagine (Asn) minimal medium, however, P. stutzeri has a typical doubling time of about 34 minutes. Despite the differences in doubling time between the two media, P. stutzeri reaches its stationary phase around 10–11 hours after being inoculated, or introduced, into both media. P. stutzeri grows best in media containing 2% NaCl although it can tolerate a salinity (NaCl content) ranging of 1–5%. This bacterium prefers a neutral [[pH] (pH7), but it can grow at a pH as high as 9. P. stutzeri possesses both type IV pili and a polar flagellum, both of which help it to be motile.

All Pseudomonas bacteria were originally thought to be incapable of fixing nitrogen. Several Pseudomonas species, including P. stutzeri, however, have since been discovered that have demonstrated the ability to fix nitrogen. Sequencing the genome of the P. stutzeri strain DSM4166 revealed some genes for nitrogen fixation, along with 42 genes that coded for major parts of a denitrification complex. Scientists hypothesize that the genes needed to fix nitrogen were acquired by these particular bacterial species through lateral gene transfer. Similar to other bacteria within the Pseudomonas genus, P. stutzeri strains are heterotrophic organisms that are capable of reducing metals and degrading compounds such as hydrocarbons. Unlike other bacteria within the genus, however, P. stutzeri strains are not fluorescent.

Growth conditions 
P. stutzeri strains are capable of growing on several various types of media because they can use different electron donors and acceptors to fuel their metabolisms. The bacterium frequently utilizes organic compounds as its electron donors, some of which include: glucose, lactate, acetate, succinate, pyruvate, sucrose and fumarate. As an electron acceptor, P. stutzeri will either use oxygen, if it is in aerobic conditions, or nitrate, if it is in anaerobic conditions. While the bacterium has been shown to grow on solid media (such as gelatin and agar), liquid media (such as nitrate or nitrite-free media), and even potatoes, it shows optimal growth on peptone or yeast agar. When in aerobic environments, P. stutzeri can even grow on more complex media such as lysogeny and Reasoner's 2A (R2A) broths, with the latter of the two being significantly useful in selecting for specific microbes due to its lack of abundant nutrients. Each of the assorted media produce their own slight variations in the phenotypes of the P. stutzeri colonies that result from growth. Some of these variations include changes in surface film or mucus production, changes in texture (such as addition of ridges), or changes in shape (such as circular to polygon-like).

Colony characteristics 
While the microbial colonies of P. stutzeri can alter based on what medium the bacterium is grown on, there are conserved, distinguishable characteristics that are apparent in almost every colony of this species. When examined on solid media, this bacterium has dry, rigid colonies that cling together so tightly it is often easier to remove an entire colony, if needed, rather than just a piece of one. The color of the colonies is usually brown, although it can deviate with a change in media. The shape of each colony mimics that of a crater because the exterior edges are raised, forming a depression in the center. The edges of each colony project outwards often allowing colonies to come into contact with one another.

Metabolism 
P. stutzeri is a facultative anaerobe that utilizes respiratory metabolism with terminal electron acceptors such as oxygen and nitrogen. When grown anaerobically, organisms within the genus Pseudomonas are considered to be model organisms for studying denitrification. Strains tested by Stainer and coworkers were able to grow and utilize the following substrates: gluconate, D-glucose, D-maltose, starch, glycerol, acetate, butyrate, isobutyrate, isovalerate, propionate, fumarate, glutarate, glycolate, glyoxylate, DL-3-hydroxybutyrate, itaconate, DL-lactate, DL-malate, malonate, oxaloacetate, 2-oxoglutarate, pyruvate, succinate, D-alanine, D-asparagine, L-glutamate, L-glutamine, L-isoleucine, and L-proline and hydrolysis of L-alanine-para-nitroanilide. D-maltose, starch, and ethylene glycol are carbon sources that are not commonly utilized by other pseudomonads as shown by Stainer et al.

Thiosulfate oxidation 
Some strains of P. stutzeri are known to use thiosulfate as an inorganic energy source. In 1999, Sorokin et al. isolated and described seven strains of P. stutzeri that were able to use nitrite, nitrate, or nitrous oxide as electron acceptors in the oxidation of thiosulfate to tetrathionate under anaerobic conditions. The oxidation of thiosulfate to tetrathionate cannot support autotrophic growth as it only yields one electron, therefore strains that perform this are obligate heterotrophs. Thiosulfate oxidation can occur in the presence or absence of oxygen, although it occurs much slower under anaerobic conditions.

Phosphite and hypophosphite oxidation 
In 1998, Metcalf and Wolfe enriched for and isolated a P. stutzeri strain WM88 that could oxidize reduced phosphorus compounds, such as phosphite and hypophosphite, to phosphate. To enrich for a hypophosphite-utilizing organism, a 0.4% glucose-MOPS medium containing 0.5 mM hypophosphite was used as the sole phosphorus source with inoculum from a variety of soil and water environments. Specifically, strain WM88 can use phosphite as its sole phosphorus source when grown in succinate-MOPS medium. When grown anaerobically, the researchers showed P. stutzeri is unable to perform hypophosphite oxidation with nitrate as its electron acceptor. However, phosphite oxidation is unaffected under similar conditions.

Hydrocarbon degradation

Aliphatic hydrocarbon degradation 
In 1913, a strain of P. stutzeri was one of the first microorganisms to be identified as a degrader of alkanes. There is not much information in the literature about other aliphatic hydrocarbon degrading strains of P. stutzeri, however strain KC has been studied extensively due to its potential biotechnological applications. Strain KC was isolated from an aquifer and it is able to transform carbon tetrachloride to carbon dioxide, formate, and other less dangerous products. Carbon tetrachloride can be a pollutant in soils and groundwater, and according to the Center for Disease Control and Prevention (CDC) it is able to cause kidney damage and even death in individuals exposed to it for long periods of time. For biotechnological purposes, strain KC can mineralize carbon tetrachloride, which is useful for in situremediation of aquifers contaminated with carbon tetrachloride.

Aromatic hydrocarbon degradation 
Aromatic compounds, such as benzene, are considered to be environmental pollutants despite their natural prevalence in nature. Strain P16 of P. stutzeri is a polycyclic aromatic hydrocarbon (PAH) degrading bacterium that was isolated from creosote-contaminated soil via a phenanthrene enrichment culture. As the sole carbon and energy source, strain P16 is able to grow using phenanthrene, fluorene, naphthalene, and methylnaphthalenes. In conjunction with the anionic surfactant Tergitol NP10 and phenanthrene, strain P16 has been proposed to be a model for looking at the effects of surfactants on non-aqueous hydrocarbon bioavailability.

Genomics 
The inclusion of this bacterium into the Pseudomonas genus was confirmed by DNA-DNA hybridization and similarity comparisons of the rRNA sequences. Four rrn operons and an origin of replication site have been identified in P. stutzeri. Strains of P. stutzeri are divided into separate genomic groups called genomovars. The genomovar concept was used for P. stutzeri to distinguish genotypically similar strains. Two strains of P. stutzeri can be classified in a single genomovar if DNA-DNA similarity is at least 70% similar. Seven genomovars have been characterized and their genome sizes range from 3.75 to 4.64 Mbp. These differences in genomovar genomes are believed to have been caused by chromosomal rearrangements during its evolution.

The GC content of the genomes of P. stutzeri strains falls between 60 – 66 mol%. P. stutzeri strain DSM4166 is a strain that has been studied and shown specifically to have exactly 61.74% GC content in its circular chromosome. While this strain appears to have no plasmid in coordination with its chromosome, it is thought that the strain has 59 tRNA genes and 4 rRNA operons. When doing global genome comparisons between multiple P. stutzeri strains, it has been found that many of the genomic regions of this bacterium's genome are conserved between varying strains. One of the strains that has been found to vary is strain RCH2. This strain has an extra 244 genes which are believed to aid the bacterium in chemotaxis and in the formation of both a pilus and the pyruvate/ 2-oxoglutarate complex. When this strain was sequenced, it was found to have a 4.6 Mb circular chromosome and three plasmids.

A comparative genomic and phylogenomic study analyzed 494 complete genomes from the entire Pseudomonas genus, with 19 of the being classified within the wider P. stutzeri evolutionary group. These 19 P. stutzeri genomes encoded between 3342 and 4524 (average: 4086) proteins each, with 2080 of them being shared among all members of the group (core proteins).

Ecology 
Originally, P. stutzeri strains were misidentified with other species in similar growth environments due to the limitations of phenotypically similar bacteria of Pseudomonas. P. stutzeri is found widely in the environment and occupies a diverse range of ecological niches including being found to be an opportunistic pathogen in humans. The habitats and ecology of P. stutzeri are diverse not only because of its ability to grow organotrophically or anaerobically using oxidative metabolism, but also because of its chemolithotrophic properties, its resistance to metals, the wide sources of nitrogen it can use, and the range of temperatures that support its growth.

P. stutzeri genes have been found in the rhizosphere region of soil implying the relevance of this bacterium as a nitrogen fixer. This bacterium has been isolated from oil-contaminated soil and marine water/sediment samples. While most Pseudomonas strains that have been isolated from marine environments are eventually transferred to another genus after classification, P. stutzeri is one of the few strains that has not. This strain meets the requirements of being able to tolerate NaCl and it is found in water columns in the Pacific Ocean and sediments in the Mediterranean. These marine strains have many ecological roles including naphthalene degradation, sulfur oxidation, and most importantly denitrification and diazotrophy (nitrogen fixation). There is also evidence of P. stutzeri in wastewater treatment plants. ZoBell, AN10, NF13, MT-1, and HTA208 are the most significant strains isolated from marine environments and have been found in places such as water columns in the Pacific-ocean, polluted Mediterranean marine sediments, Galapagos rifts near hydrothermal vent at depths of 2500 meters, and Mariana trench samples at 11 000 meters. Several other P. stutzeri strains have even been found in other locations such as manure, pond water, straw and humus samples.

Relevance

Health 
Several strains of Pseudomonas stutzeri have been found to behave as opportunistic pathogens in humans. It was not until 1973, however, that P. stutzeris ability to cause infection started to become a topic of discussion within scientific literature. The first known infection was observed in combination with a permanent tibial fracture that required surgery. Since that initial infection, P. stutzeri has been able to cause infections within individuals that have a variety of illnesses, including: endocarditis, infections of the bone, eye, skin or urinary tract, meningitis, pneumonia, arthritis, and several others. Some patients even have health conditions as serious as tumors, infected joint cavities and collapsed lungs. Within those infected, P. stutzeri strains have been isolated from the blood, feces, cerebral spinal fluid, ears, eyes, and organ systems (such as respiratory and urinary). When strains of this bacterium are discovered within infected patients they are often accompanied by other pathogenic microbes.

While P. stutzeri has caused numerous infections since it has been discovered, it has caused few deaths, giving it a much lower virulence rating in relation to other Pseudomonas species, such as Pseudomonas aeruginosa. Despite its lack of major virulence, however, this bacterium still poses a threat to human health because it contains a variety of antibiotic resistance mechanisms. In fact, P. stutzeri has so many resistance mechanisms that antibiotic-resistant P. stutzeri strains have been discovered and isolated for almost every antibiotic family except fluoroquinolones. Some of the more-studied resistance mechanisms include: utilization of beta-lactamases, which are able to cleave penicillins, cephalosporins, and other antibiotic classes, and ability to vary lipopolysaccharide and outer membrane protein components. In order to gain resistance to fluoroquinolones, mutations in the gyrA (gyrase gene) and parC(topoisomerase IV gene) are often needed, mutations which are not as common. Only one strain of P. stutzeri, strain 13, has been found to have mutations that allow it to be resistant to fluoroquinolones. The reason P. stutzeri strains are less of a concern for major antibiotic resistance as compared to other Pseudomonas strains, like P. aeruginosa, is likely due to the fact the strains are less common in clinical settings and thus less frequently exposed to antibiotics.

Environmental 
Some strains of P. stutzeri are capable of associating with pollutants and toxic metals, such as biocides and oil derivatives, in such a way that allows the bacterium to promote the degradation of these substances. Other strains of this bacterium have metabolic capabilities, such as metal cycling, that allow for the preservation of essential metals, such as copper and iron, and the degradation of toxic metals, such as uranium and lead. One specific strain of P. stutzeri, strain RCH2, is currently being studied as a potential tool for the bioremediation of soil and water supplies since it has shown an ability to reduce hexavalent chromium concentrations in areas where this pollutant is high. Several other P. stutzeri strains, such as strain A15, have demonstrated an ability to reduce atmospheric nitrogen so they are being explored as agents to help increase plant growth. These strains are specifically being studied for use in rice plants because they have been shown to naturally infect and inhabit the roots of these plants. By living within the roots, P. stutzeri is able to supply the plants directly with the reduced nitrogen compounds they produce.

Microbiological 
Several different strains of P. stutzeri have been found to be competent for natural genetic transformation. The frequency of transformation between individuals of the same P. stutzeri strain is typically high. Between individuals of different strains, or between P. stutzeri strains and other Pseudomonas species, however, the frequency of transformation is usually greatly reduced. The complete genome sequence of a highly transformable P. stutzeri strain, strain 28a24, has been determined and is available for observation.

References

External links 
 Migula's Systematic Bacteriology (in German)
Type strain of Pseudomonas stutzeri at BacDive – the Bacterial Diversity Metadatabase

Pseudomonadales
Bacteria described in 1896